The Royal Navy 5th Destroyer Squadron was a naval unit of the Royal Navy (RN) from 1952 to 2002.

History
After World War II, the British Royal Navy reverted to its previous layout and command structure in February 1947; the 5th Destroyer Flotilla of the Home Fleet was reactivated, it was re-designated 5th Destroyer Squadron in January 1952, and succeeded by the 5th Destroyer Squadron.  The Admiralty controlled global deployment of the Navy until 1964, when that department was abolished and replaced by the new Navy Department, within the newly formed Ministry of Defence.  These geographic commands usually comprised fleets, squadrons, flotillas, and single ships.  In 1954, major re-structuring of the composition of the Royal Navy was undertaken; leading to downsizing, and warships being rotated between the various fleets and stations.  Between 1954 and 1971, many commands were either abolished or amalgamated into larger geographic commands.  By the end of 1966, all Royal Navy squadrons were disbanded.  Squadrons remaining in the Far East Fleet were renamed, 1st, 2nd, and 3rd Far East Destroyer Squadrons.  No squadrons existed in the Western Fleet for the period 1967 to 1971.  In November 1971, nearly all British naval forces were brought under the command of a single fleet, whose headquarters was at Northwood, Middlesex, then under the control of Commander-in-Chief Fleet (CinC-Fleet).  From 1981 to 2002, both Type 42 destroyers and frigates during this period were deployed to squadrons and the same ship class.  In peacetime, the squadron's role was usually administrative, and during the last two decades of its existence, the squadron was based at HMNB Portsmouth.

Organisational changes
Note: Command structure organisational changes took place within Royal Navy post war period, the term Flotilla was previously applied to a tactical unit until 1951, which led to the creation of three specific Flag Officers, Flotillas responsible for the Eastern, Home, and Mediterranean fleets, the existing destroyer flotillas were re-organised now as administrative squadrons.

Operational deployments
Included:

Composition
Included:

, Home Fleet, 1952
HMS Solebay (leader)
HMS Gabbard
HMS St. James
HMS St. Kitts
HMS Sluys - (September 1952)

, Home Fleet, 1953
HMS Solebay (leader) - (July 1953)
HMS Gabbard - (February 1954)
HMS St. James - (June 1953)
HMS St. Kitts - (July 1953)

, Home Fleet, to August 1954
HMS Duchess (leader)
HMS Decoy - (January 1959)

, Mediterranean Fleet, September 1954 – June 1955
HMS Duchess (leader)
HMS Decoy - (January 1959)
HMS Diamond
HMS Diana

, Home Fleet, July 1955 – February 1956
HMS Duchess (leader)
HMS Decoy - (January 1959)
HMS Diamond
HMS Diana

, Mediterranean Fleet, March 1956 – January 1957
HMS Duchess (leader)
HMS Decoy - (January 1959)
HMS Diamond
HMS Diana

, Home Fleet, February 1957 – August 1957
HMS Duchess (leader)
HMS Decoy - (January 1959)
HMS Diamond
HMS Diana

, Mediterranean Fleet, September 1957 – June 1958
HMS Duchess (leader)
HMS Decoy - (January 1959)
HMS Diamond
HMS Diana

, Home Fleet, July 1958 – December 1958
HMS Duchess (leader)
HMS Decoy - (January 1959)
HMS Diamond
HMS Diana

, Home Fleet, January 1961 – August 1961
HMS Duchess (leader)
HMS Diamond
HMS Diana

, (August 1962)

, Home Fleet, September 1961 – April 1962
HMS Duchess (leader)
HMS Diamond
HMS Diana
HMS Crossbow
HMS Battleaxe, (August 1962)

, Home Fleet, May 1962 – January 1963
HMS Duchess (leader)
HMS Diamond
HMS Diana
HMS Crossbow
HMS Battleaxe, (August 1962)

, Second Flotilla, Portsmouth, December 1980 – April 1992
, (leader), (1980–84), (1989–96)
, (August 1981 - February 2002)
HMS Southampton, (leader)  (1985–89)
 (March 1986 - February 2002)
HMS Cardiff, (leader) (1998-2002)
, (May 1982 - February 2002) 	
, (November 1982 - February 2002) 	
, (November 1982 - February 2002) 	
, (May 1985 - February 2002) 	
, (March 1986 - February 2002) 	

, Fleet, Portsmouth, May 1992 – February 2002
HMS Exeter, (leader), (1980–84), (1989–96)
HMS Southampton, (August 1981 - February 2002)
HMS Southampton, (Leader)  (1985–89)
HMS Cardiff, (March 1986 - February 2002)
HMS Cardiff, (leader)  (1998-2002)
HMS Liverpool (May 1982 - February 2002) 	
HMS Nottingham (November 1982 - February 2002) 
HMS Manchester (November 1982 - February 2002) 
HMS Gloucester (May 1985 - February 2002)
HMS Newcastle (March 1986 - February 2002)

Squadron commander

Of note, for the last few months of its existence, Command of the 5th Destroyer Squadron was combined with that of the 3rd Destroyer Squadron, as the 'Commander of the 3rd and 5th Destroyer Squadrons' prior to abolition of both squadrons and the incorporation of all the Type 42 destroyers within the newly established Portsmouth Flotilla.

See also
List of squadrons and flotillas of the Royal Navy
Stone frigate

References

Sources
Mackie. Colin (2017). Senior Royal Navy Appointments from 1865: Gulabin. http://www.Gulabin.com/.
Smith. Gordon and Watson, Graham. Dr. (2015) The Royal Navy, post 1945. Royal Navy Organisation and Ship Deployments 1947-2013. https://Naval-History.net.

Destroyer squadrons of the Royal Navy